In enzymology, a xyloglucan-specific exo-beta-1,4-glucanase is an enzyme that catalyzes the chemical reaction

xyloglucan + H2O  xyloglucan oligosaccharides (exohydrolysis of 1,4-beta-D-glucosidic linkages in xyloglucan)

Thus, the two substrates of this enzyme are xyloglucan and H2O, and its products are xyloglucan oligosaccharides (exohydrolysis of 1,4-beta-D-glucosidic linkages in xyloglucan).

This enzyme belongs to the family of hydrolases, specifically those glycosidases that hydrolyse O- and S-glycosyl compounds.  The systematic name of this enzyme class is [(1->6)-alpha-D-xylo]-(1->4)-beta-D-glucan exo-glucohydrolase. This enzyme is also called Cel74A.

References

Further reading 

 

EC 3.2.1
Enzymes of unknown structure